Greece competed at the 2023 European Athletics Indoor Championships in Istanbul, Turkey, between 2 and 5 March 2023 with 19 athletes.

Medals

Results

References

European Athletics Championships
2023